Brian Greenaway (born 26 September 1957) was an English professional footballer who played as a winger in the Football League for Fulham. He later played in Cyprus and in non-League football.

Personal life 
Greenaway worked as a painter and decorator and a chauffeur.

Career statistics

Honours 
Wealdstone

 Alliance Premier League: 1984–85
 FA Trophy: 1984–85

References 

English footballers
English expatriate footballers
English Football League players
1957 births
Living people
Footballers from Fulham
Fulham F.C. players
APOEL FC players
English expatriates in Cyprus
Expatriate footballers in Cyprus
Association football wingers
National League (English football) players
Isthmian League players
Wealdstone F.C. players
Dagenham F.C. players
Tooting & Mitcham United F.C. players
Slough Town F.C. players
Wycombe Wanderers F.C. players
Staines Town F.C. players
Chauffeurs
Cypriot First Division players